Live in the Moment may refer to:

Academic
Mindfulness, a psychological process of directing, focusing and feeling our attention to experiences occurring in the present moment

Albums
Live in the Moment (album), a 2017 Cantonese-language studio album by Gin Lee
Live...in the Moment, a 2007 live album by Vic Juris
Live...in the Moment, a 2016 live album by Gang of Four

Songs
"Live in the Moment" (song), a 2017 song by Portugal. The Man from Woodstock
"Live in the Moment", a 2015 song by Hala Al Turk
"Live in the Moment", a 2016 song by Teenage Fanclub from Here
"Live in the Moment", a 2018 song by Craig David from The Time Is Now

Expression
Carpe diem, "seize the day", saviour life and realize the importance of the moment

See also
Living in the Moment (disambiguation)
Live for the Moment (disambiguation)